Catherine Lepesant (born 5 February 1972) is a French sailor. She competed in the Yngling event at the 2008 Summer Olympics.

References

External links
 

1972 births
Living people
French female sailors (sport)
Olympic sailors of France
Sailors at the 2008 Summer Olympics – Yngling
People from Villemomble